Founded and established by Ottawa real estate developer Bruce Firestone, the Ottawa Senators are the second National Hockey League (NHL) franchise to have the Ottawa Senators name. The original Ottawa Senators, founded in 1883, had a famed history, winning 11 Stanley Cups and played in the NHL from 1917 until 1934. On December 6, 1990, after a two-year public campaign by Firestone to return the NHL to Ottawa, the NHL awarded a new franchise, which began play in the 1992–93 season.

The club has seen its share of struggles, both on and off the ice. The team has had two changes of ownership, from Firestone to Rod Bryden in 1993 due to the arena development process and its financing, and subsequently to Eugene Melnyk after the team filed for bankruptcy in 2003. On the ice, the club finished last in the League in its first four seasons. Changes in hockey management have led to steady improvement of the team's play, resulting in the team qualifying for the Stanley Cup playoffs in 11 of the last 12 seasons, winning the Presidents' Trophy in 2002–03 and making it to the Stanley Cup Finals in 2007.

The "Bring back the Senators" campaign
At the weekly Terrace Investments Ltd. management meeting on December 4, 1987, Duncan MacDonald tabled the initial idea of the NHL returning to Ottawa after learning (Ottawa Citizen, Sports section) about the League's expansion plans for three new franchises in the 1990s. The idea incubated with real estate developer Bruce Firestone for months and accepted that Ottawa was now ready to again support a franchise. He decided to launch a bid for the Ottawa franchise through his development firm Terrace Investments. Firestone first told his fellow Terrace executives, Cyril Leeder, and Randy Sexton, after a game of shinny hockey in March 1988. Both were surprised; Leeder thought the idea was "ridiculous".

Terrace did not have enough assets to finance the team, but Firestone believed that they could do so as part of a development project. Getting an NHL club for the arena would drive up the price of the surrounding lands and Terrace's net worth would jump from $100 million to $400 million by 1997. The strategy was straightforward: "Buy the site, win the franchise, build the building." In 1989, Terrace found a suitable site west of Ottawa,  of farmland, located on both sides of the 417 Highway west of Terry Fox Drive in the then City of Kanata.

On June 22, 1989, Terrace publicly announced their intentions to acquire an NHL franchise and revive the Senators name. The name choice provoked threats of legal action, though Firestone obtained permission from original-era / 1950s era Senators club owner Tommy Gorman's descendants to use the old Senators name and settled with the Ottawa Jr. Senators' owners.

To kick off the "Bring Back the Senators" campaign, Terrace held a press conference on September 7, 1989 with special guests Frank Finnigan, representing the old Senators' players, and Joe Gorman, representing the Gorman family. Finnigan, the last surviving member of the Senators' last Stanley Cup championship (in 1927), was presented with a new number 8 jersey and the promise to have him drop the first puck at the first game if they emerged victorious. Terrace unveiled drawings of the $55 million, 22,500 seat arena, now named the Palladium, designed by Rossetti Associates, architects of The Palace of Auburn Hills arena. Also unveiled was a logo for the team using a stylized Peace Tower and Canadian flag, designed by David O'Malley of Ottawa. The theme song for the franchise drive was Tom Petty's "I Won't Back Down."

The Senators' bid was considered something of a longshot. Jim Durrell, the mayor of Ottawa at the time, but later part of the Senators' front office, said, "It's not that the area isn't a big enough market to support a professional hockey team, it's just that we're not going to get it." National Hockey League Players' Association (NHLPA) head Alan Eagleson was quoted as saying, "Local fans are being led through the petunia patch if Bruce Firestone thinks he can land an NHL expansion franchise for Ottawa this century, well into the next or ever." Despite the naysayers, 11,000 fans sent in $25 non-refundable pledges toward season-tickets by November 1990.

In December 1990, the NHL held a meeting in Palm Beach, Florida, to consider expansion applications. The NHL executives were reportedly impressed by the Ottawa presentation, including Finnigan's participation, the several hundred fans and the marching band who traveled to Palm Beach, but apparently were more impressed at the fact that the group was one of the few applicants willing to pay the $50 million franchise fee without reservations. On December 6, 1990, the Terrace group was approved to purchase one of the two franchises (along with the Tampa Bay Lightning) to start play in the 1992–93 season.

Financing struggles

The Palladium project
Since the location for the new arena was on land designated for agriculture, the arena and development had to be approved by the Government of Ontario. The Ontario New Democratic Party government of Bob Rae was not sympathetic to the conversion of farmland and would not lend any assistance to the project. As the rezoning hearings dragged on, Firestone was offered $20 million to relocate to Anaheim, which had an arena, but no team. Firestone turned it down, claiming, "I didn’t bring back the Ottawa Senators to play in Anaheim." Anaheim would eventually land an expansion team of its own (called the Mighty Ducks), which commenced play one year after Ottawa.

Eventually, the rezoning was approved with conditions. The Palladium's size was reduced to 18,500, and Terrace had to pay for a necessary highway interchange. Terrace had to suspend its plans for the rest of the "West Terrace" development, which limited the site's value. Only the lands to the south of the 417 were allowed to be developed, and the lands on the north side of the 417 were to remain farmland. According to Firestone, Terrace's investment lost $80 million in value to secure the zoning. Eventually, the strain to complete the payment on the franchise to the NHL and to build the arena led to Firestone's resignation on August 17, 1993, after Terrace missed mortgage and development payments. He was replaced as club president by Bryden, who would lead the franchise for the next ten years.

Financing of the arena project was difficult. Terrace had four financing deals fail. As it became clear that the Senators could not finance a needed highway interchange without government backing, the Government of Ontario was persuaded successfully to provide a $27 million loan for the highway interchange construction. In the end, the firm of Ogden Entertainment, a New York City facilities management firm, backed the project with a $20 million loan in exchange for a 30-year contract to manage the facility. In addition, American banks loaned $110 million, the federal government gave the Senators $6 million, $10 million from Terrace and $15 million from a Canadian pension fund.

The Senators played the first game at the Palladium (today called Canadian Tire Centre) on January 17, 1996. One month after opening, Corel Corporation bought the naming rights in a ten-year deal and the arena was renamed the Corel Centre. The naming rights were then purchased by Scotiabank in a 25-year deal and the arena was re-branded Scotiabank Place. Seven years later, Scotiabank sold the naming rights to Canadian Tire Corporation in a deal which saw the facility receive its current name.

The bankruptcy
The debt payments weighed heavily on the Senators. For several years, Bryden tried to reschedule the debt on the arena. There were various attempts at filing tax losses to write off the debt, all rejected by the federal government. In 2002, Ogden went bankrupt. It had re-invented itself as Covanta Energy and failed not long after the Enron scandal broke out. This led to the Senators filing for bankruptcy on January 9, 2003, when it could not arrange financing to pay all it owed to Covanta, becoming due because of Covanta's bankruptcy.
 
On August 26, 2003 the team and arena was purchased by Biovail chief executive officer (CEO) and Toronto St. Michael's Majors owner Eugene Melnyk, who had shown interest for several years in the team. The limited partnership between Terrace and the limited partners was dissolved and Covanta's creditors received the proceeds of the sale towards the money it was owed for the NHL franchise fee and the Palladium.

1992–1995: Expansion club struggles
The team would name Mel Bridgman as their first general manager (GM) in 1991 after being turned down by Scotty Bowman and John Muckler. The decision was criticized by the press due to Bridgman's lack of GM experience. In the coaching department, the club would pick Rick Bowness, formerly the Boston Bruins' head coach, as their first head coach, assisted by Alain Vigneault, E. J. Maguire and Chico Resch. John Ferguson, Sr., would be named director of player personnel.

The Expansion draft day on June 18, 1992, was memorable. The team's laptop computer failed and the club was unprepared with a backup plan, picking several ineligible players. Not much talent was available as other teams protected young prospects. The players the Senators did select were "journeymen NHLers or players who had good years in minor leagues but no longer were considered prospects." While side-deals during the Draft were not allowed, the team would select players in concert with the other teams and in return, other teams gave the Senators Neil Brady, Jody Hull, Brad Marsh and Steve Weeks during the summer, all who would ultimately make the team. In the Entry Draft, the Senators would name Alexei Yashin their first-ever pick, though he would not join the team until 1993.

1992–93: First season

The new Senators were placed in the Adams Division of the Wales Conference, and played their first game on October 8, 1992, at the Ottawa Civic Centre against the Montreal Canadiens. There was much pre-game spectacle — the skating of Brian Orser, the raising of banners commemorating the original Senators' eight Stanley Cup wins, retirement of Frank Finnigan's jersey number and the singing of the anthem by Ottawa native Alanis Morissette.

NHL President Gil Stein took part, presenting Bruce Firestone with a "certificate of reinstatement" to commemorate Ottawa's return to the NHL after 58 years. The ceremonial face-off between Laurie Boschman and Denis Savard was done by Frank Finnigan, Jr., (his father having died on December 25, 1991), Firestone, Stein and original Senator Ray Kinsella. The Senators would play in the 10,000 seat Civic Centre until January 1996.

The Senators would defeat the eventual Stanley Cup champion Canadiens 5–3 that night, but it would turn out to be their only highlight of the season for the Senators. The club would tie with the San Jose Sharks for the worst record in the League that year, winning just ten games with 70 losses and four ties (24 points) in the 1992–93 season. The Senators still hold the NHL record for least road wins for their record that season, with one. Their points total for the season was one point better than the NHL record for fewest points in a season ever. The Senators had aimed low. Firestone had set beating the old record the Senators' goal for the season, as the team planned to finish low in the standings for its first few years in order to receive high draft picks.

Daigle Cup
Among the disappointments during the early years of the resurrected Senators was Alexandre Daigle, the number one overall pick in the 1993 NHL Entry Draft. During the 1992–93 season, it had become clear that Daigle would be the number one pick. The Quebec Nordiques publicly announced that they would trade several players for him, as they wished to build a new arena and needed a marquee francophone player. As the season progressed, both the Senators and the San Jose Sharks were neck-and-neck in last place, and at that time, NHL rules meant the worst team would receive the first overall pick. This "competition" was variously dubbed the "Daigle Cup" and the "Yelnats Puc."

Near the end of the season, the Senators would call other teams to ask for their opponent's best players to be playing them in upcoming matches, making plans to field a weaker squad if their opponent did so also. The club made no trades to improve its position, not wanting to lose the number one pick. After the season, Bruce Firestone would make comments to the press about how the team deliberately lost games, expecting that comments would be "off the record." Instead, his comments were reported, the NHL investigated, and the team was fined $100,000 for his comments. The NHL changed its rules as of the 1995 Draft so that a lottery would be held for the top draft picks.

In 1993, the Senators would sign Daigle to a $12.25 million contract, the largest rookie salary in League history, which would lead to a cap on rookie contracts a few years later. The club would promote Daigle over Alexei Yashin, nominating Daigle for rookie of the year over Yashin. His play did not justify full-time status and in 1995, coaches Rick Bowness and Alain Vigneault demoted Daigle to part-time status. The move led to Bowness and Vigneault being fired. In the end, Daigle did not come close to the career the Senators hoped for. After scoring only 74 goals in just over four seasons, he was traded to the Philadelphia Flyers, and is widely regarded as one of the biggest draft busts in sports history.

1993–1995
After the 1992–93 season, Bridgman was fired and replaced by Senators Vice-President Randy Sexton. In the 1993–94 season, with the NHL renaming the conferences and divisions, the team was now based in the Eastern Conference's Northeast Division. The club added prospects Daigle and Yashin. Yashin would have an outstanding rookie season and become a finalist for the Calder Memorial Trophy. Yashin led the team in points with 30 goals and 79 points, while Daigle had 51 points. The Senators would make some progress, improving their record to 14 wins and 37 points, but would again finish last in the League. The Senators would select Radek Bonk with their pick, third overall, in the 1994 Draft.

During this period, the club may have been more focused on building the Palladium, for which construction began in July 1994. In the lockout-shortened 1994–95 season, Yashin and Daigle led the club in points again, although their point totals declined. The 1994–95 Senators team record declined also from the previous season, finishing with nine wins and 23 points (this was over only 48 games), to finish last in the League again.

1996–2004: Jacques Martin era

Ottawa's turnaround
One month before the Senators were to open the new Palladium, after three-straight last place finishes, and poor attendance at the Civic Centre, the Senators organization was in turmoil. Star player Alexei Yashin, angered that management favoured Daigle over him despite posting higher numbers, was a contract hold-out. First-round draft choice Bryan Berard, who had left the Senators training camp unsigned to a contract, had publicly stated that he would never report to the Senators. After Head Coach Rick Bowness demoted Daigle to the fourth line, General Manager Randy Sexton fired Bowness and Assistant Coach Alain Vigneault on November 20, 1995. He replaced the coaches with Prince Edward Island Senators coach Dave Allison and gave the assistant coaching job to former Hartford Whalers Head Coach Pierre McGuire, who was working at the time as a scout for the Senators. Daigle was returned to full-time duty, but Sexton's changes did not improve the team's play.

The situation was a large concern for the Senators ownership and especially for Ogden, which had much invested in the soon-to-open Palladium and which did not want to open the Palladium to poor attendance. Ogden brought in Roy Mlakar to assist in sorting out the turmoil; he would eventually become team president and CEO.

The turnaround process started with the firing of Sexton on December 11, 1995, and the hiring of the Mighty Ducks of Anaheim Assistant General Manager Pierre Gauthier as GM, Ottawa's first with previous NHL executive experience. Before the end of January, Gauthier had signed Yashin to a three-year contract, traded Berard to the New York Islanders for Wade Redden, and hired Jacques Martin as head coach.

In the midst of the upheaval, the new Palladium had opened. The Senators, still coached by Allison, lost their opening game in the arena 3–0 to Montreal on January 17, 1996. The event was much more subdued than their franchise's first game. The Cup banners were raised, but the winches jammed, blocking the view of many fans. There were no entertainment big names, and only Firestone and Bryden participated in the ceremonial face-off. The club would lose its first four games at the Palladium, winning none for Allison, who was later fired on January 24 after the team lost 22 of 25 games. While Ottawa finished last in the League for the fourth year in a row, the 1995–96 season ended with renewed optimism, partly from the debut of new star Daniel Alfredsson, who won the Calder Trophy, the NHL rookie of the year award, the first Senator to do so. Alfredsson, selected 133rd overall in 1994, was also selected to play in the 1996 NHL All-Star Game.

The 1996–97 season would see the Senators qualify for the Stanley Cup playoffs for the first time, in dramatic fashion. They clinched the seventh seed on the last game of the regular season thanks to a late goal from Steve Duchesne against the Buffalo Sabres' Dominik Hasek, giving the Senators a 1–0 win and the first playoff appearance for an Ottawa-based team in 67 years. The Senators then faced Buffalo in the first round of the playoffs and were eliminated in the full seven games. Despite holding a lead in Game 7, Alexei Yashin put the puck in his own net, allowing Buffalo to tie the game and eventually win the game and the series on a goal by Derek Plante in overtime.

The next season, 1997–98, saw the Senators improve further. They improved their regular season record, finishing with their first winning record in franchise history (one game over .500). In the first play-off round, they upset the top-seeded and the heavily favoured New Jersey Devils in six games to win their first playoff series. The Senators next faced the eventual Eastern Conference champion Washington Capitals and lost in five games. It was in this season that the team unveiled its "third jersey" in red with the Centurion head logo "rotated" to face forward. The jersey and logo would be used until the end of the 2006–07 season.

After the season, Rick Dudley would become general manager after Pierre Gauthier returned to Anaheim to become the Ducks' general manager. Dudley would be the Ottawa GM for only a year, however, leaving to join Tampa Bay (for which the Senators received Rob Zamuner as compensation), and was replaced by Marshall Johnston.

Emergence as contenders
The Senators met with limited success in the playoffs, only winning five series in their first nine trips to the post-season.

In 1998–99, the Senators jumped from 14th in the previous season to third, with 103 points—the first 100-point season in club history. The team, however, took an embarrassing pratfall in the playoffs, being swept by Buffalo after scoring just three goals in the entire series.

Ottawa was locked in a contract dispute with then-captain Alexei Yashin during the 1999–2000 season. Yashin held out for the entire season, hoping either to play elsewhere or claim his contract was for 1999–2000, not a year of service. The team responded by suspending him for the entire season and granting the captaincy to Daniel Alfredsson. Yashin tried to sign on with a team in Switzerland, but the International Ice Hockey Federation (IIHF) banned him from playing internationally until the dispute with the Senators was resolved. An NHL arbitrator rejected Yashin's request to make him a free agent, instead ruling that he owed the Senators one more season if he ever returned to the NHL. The Senators even took legal action to recover damages suffered as a result of the dispute.

Despite the distraction, the Senators' regular season was successful as they finished with 93 points to qualify for the playoffs in sixth place in the Eastern Conference. Like the previous year, they had a quick playoff exit, losing in six games in the first round to the Toronto Maple Leafs.

Yashin returned for the 2000–01 season, though no longer the captain of the team. Despite being booed at home and in most arenas, being cursed as "Alexei Cashin" or "Cashin Yashin" by the fans, he played well for the Senators. The Senators had another successful season, finishing with 109 points, winning the Division and placing second in the East. For the third-straight season, however, the Senators could not win a playoff round, losing again to Toronto in the first round, this time in a 4–0 sweep. After the season, on the day of the 2001 NHL Entry Draft, Yashin would be dealt to the New York Islanders in exchange for Zdeno Chara, Bill Muckalt and the Islanders' first-round draft pick (second overall), which the Senators used to select Jason Spezza. Yashin would sign a $87.5 million ten-year contract with the Islanders.

In 2001–02, the Senators regular season points total dropped to 94 points, third in the Division, but the team did qualify for the playoffs. Jacques Martin stepped aside as head coach for the final two games to allow Assistant Coach Roger Neilson to have 1,000 games as head coach in the NHL. In the first round, they upset the Philadelphia Flyers in five games, limiting the Flyers' high-powered offence to just two goals for the franchise's second playoff series win. This led to a second round series with Toronto, the third-straight year the Senators had met the Maple Leafs in the "Battle of Ontario." The Maple Leafs won the series in a tense seven-game affair, despite the Senators leading the series 3–2 after five games.

After the disappointing end to the season, there was speculation that front-office changes were coming. In the end, GM Marshall Johnston retired, but Martin and Mlakar were re-signed. John Muckler was hired on June 12, 2002, the Senators' sixth GM, and the first with previous experience as a general manager (with Buffalo). He had been interested in the Ottawa job in 1991, but he chose not to wait for the Senators to make him an offer, and he joined the Sabres organization.

In 2002–03, off-ice problems dominated the headlines. The Senators filed for bankruptcy on January 9, 2003, after a long history of debt. They continued regular season play after getting some emergency financing from the NHL. Despite the off-ice problems, Ottawa won the Presidents' Trophy, finishing with a franchise-record 113 points, making them the first Canadian team to win it since the Calgary Flames in 1989. This was also the highest finish by an Ottawa team in 77 years (since the original Senators finished first overall in 1926). In the 2003 playoffs, they defeated Yashin and his New York Islanders and the Philadelphia Flyers before coming within one game of making it into the Finals, falling to the eventual Stanley Cup champions, the New Jersey Devils.

Failure in playoffs and firing of Jacques Martin

In the off-season, Eugene Melnyk would purchase the club to bring financial stability and the team entered the 2003–04 season with high expectations. Head Coach Jacques Martin would guide the team to another good regular season, finishing with 102 points. This was good for only third in the tightly contested Northeast Division, as Boston would have 104 and Toronto 103.

The seedings meant that the Senators would play the Maple Leafs in the first round of the 2004 playoffs for the fourth-straight time. By now, Ottawa had developed a strong rivalry with their Ontario rivals, and there was a great deal of pressure on the team to finally defeat the Leafs.
Despite missing their captain Mats Sundin and other veterans, the Maple Leafs would win the series on the back of goaltender Ed Belfour, who had two shutouts in the series, defeating the Senators in seven games.  In Game 7, Senators goaltender Patrick Lalime would surrender three goals before the first period was done and would be replaced by backup Martin Prusek. The Senators were not able to come back from the 3–0 deficit, losing 4–1. It was Lalime's last appearance in a Senators' uniform, and Martin's last game as coach—two days after the loss, Martin was fired. and Lalime was later traded to the St. Louis Blues for a fourth-round pick in the 2005 NHL Draft.

After losing eight of 12 playoff series, including all four series in five years against Toronto, team management felt that a new coach was required for playoff success. Muckler even suggested that the new coach would have "to fix the dressing room", implying the team was not responding to Martin. On June 8, 2004, Bryan Murray became the team's fifth head coach, leaving the Mighty Ducks of Anaheim, where he had been general manager. He would not actually coach until 2005 due to the 2004–05 NHL lockout, instead spending time on scouting.

2004–2017: Bryan Murray era

2004–05: Lockout time
The Senators, like the other NHL teams, did not play during the lockout. Most players chose to play in Europe, although some, including Jason Spezza, played for the Senators' farm team, the Binghamton Senators. Prior to the lockout, the Senators had acquired free agent goaltender Dominik Hasek. He did not play for any teams during the season, instead practicing with Binghamton. Daniel Alfredsson had a very good season in Sweden with Frölunda HC, winning the Swedish championship.

2005–06: High expectations unfulfilled

The media predicted the Senators to be Stanley Cup contenders, as they had a strong core back after the lockout, played in an up-tempo style fitting the new rule changes and Hasek was expected to provide top-notch goaltending. The team rushed out of the gate, winning 19 of the first 22 games, in the end winning 52 games and 113 points, placing first in the East, and second overall in the League.

Prior to the season, the Senators had acquired Dany Heatley in a blockbuster trade with the Atlanta Thrashers for Marian Hossa and Greg de Vries. Heatley, Alfredsson and Spezza immediately formed one of the League's top offensive lines, dubbed the "CASH line" by fans in a contest held by the Ottawa Citizen. (The name is made from the initials of Captain Alfredsson, Spezza, and Heatley. Another nickname the line has picked up is the "Pizza Line", and is the nickname used by the Citizen's rival paper, the Ottawa Sun.) The line made a dramatic debut in the first game, with Alfredsson scoring a goal to force overtime and Alfredsson and Heatley scoring goals in the League's first-ever shootout round. Heatley became the first player in franchise history to reach 100 points and the first to reach the 50-goal mark. The line is notable as a top offensive line, the top line of all time for the Senators, and is widely regarded as one of the top lines in the NHL earning such quotes as "best trio in the NHL," "most dangerous line in hockey," "high-flying trio," "League's highest scoring line" and "potent first line" in the sports media and hockey fans, both of the Senators and other teams.

Despite the regular season success, the team entered the playoffs under a cloud. In February, Hasek had suffered an adductor muscle injury while playing for the Czech Republic men's national ice hockey team during the 2006 Winter Olympics in Turin. He had played only one game for the Czechs and returned to Ottawa to heal, but would never play for the Senators again. Rookie goaltender Ray Emery had to take over the starting goaltender duties, leading the media to predict an early playoff exit due to Hasek's absence. Hopes were raised in the first round, however, when Emery would become the first rookie goaltender since Philadelphia's Brian Boucher in 2000 to win a playoff series when the Senators defeated the Tampa Bay Lightning four games to one. However, the Senators then lost to the Buffalo Sabres in the second round, a series in which all games were decided by one goal.

This was the last hurrah for several Senators, as Zdeno Chara, Dominik Hasek, Martin Havlat, Bryan Smolinski and Brian Pothier all left the team after the season; Chara, Hasek and Pothier departed via free agency, while Havlat and Smolinski were both dealt to the Chicago Blackhawks.

2006–07: Trip to the Stanley Cup Finals

The Senators' season went off to a poor start, and was marked by a struggle to reach a .500 win–loss ratio. Until December, the team had a 21–18–1 record, though they had much more success in the remaining half of the season, eventually finishing second in the Division after the Presidents' Trophy-winning Sabres and earning the fourth seed in the East. They ultimately finished with 105 points, their fourth-straight 100-point season and sixth in their last eight.

In the playoffs, Ottawa's fourth placing in the Conference meant that the first-round playoff series was against the fifth-seeded Pittsburgh Penguins. Some media were expecting the Penguins to win the series for three reasons—the Penguins had won the season series, the Senators' past playoff troubles and the strong young talent of the Penguins, particularly young star Sidney Crosby. The Senators, however, won easily by a score of four games to one, including a 3–0 shutout win in Game 5. This was the only series where the Senators were the higher-seeded team.

The second-round series was against the Atlantic Division-leading New Jersey Devils in a rematch of the 2003 Eastern Conference Finals. The Senators again won by a score of four games to one.

Next, the Senators faced off against Buffalo in the Conference Final, looking to get even for losing to the Sabres in the 2006 playoffs. The Senators took the series, again by a score of four games to one, earning the Prince of Wales Trophy as the Eastern Conference champions and advancing to the Stanley Cup Finals to face the Western Conference-winning Anaheim Ducks. Daniel Alfredsson scored the series-winning goal, (see video) in overtime, redemption for being beaten a year before on the goal that eliminated Ottawa from the playoffs. It was also the first series win by the Senators against the Sabres.

First Stanley Cup finals in the capital in 80 years

The 2006–07 Senators thus became the first Ottawa team to be in the Stanley Cup Finals since the 1927 Stanley Cup Finals. Despite the 80-year gap, one fan attended games both the 1927 and the 2007 Finals—the third game of the series and first home game for Ottawa on June 2 was attended by 99-year-old Russell Williams as a guest of the Senators. He had attended the last Finals game in Ottawa on April 13, 1927, played in the old Ottawa Auditorium. The 1927 and 2007 games were won by both Senators teams respectively.

The city was swept up in the excitement of being in the Finals. Businesses along all the main streets posted large hand-drawn "Go Sens Go" signs, residents put up large displays in front of their homes or decorated their cars. A large Senators flag was draped on the City Hall, along with a large video screen showing the games. A six-story likeness of Daniel Alfredsson was hung on the Corel building and the Senators organization held rallies at City Hall, and car rallies of decorated cars paraded from Lynx stadium, through downtown to Scotiabank Place.

The series marked the first time that an NHL team with a captain from Europe had made the Finals, as Senators captain Alfredsson hails from Sweden. (Previously, only Americans or Canadians had captained teams in the Finals.) Alfredsson would be one of the bright lights for the Senators in the series, as he had been in all the playoff series. But he would be one of the few bright lights as Anaheim won the series in five games bolstered by strong defensive play and opportunistic scoring.

The first two games were in Anaheim, both won by the Ducks by one-goal margins. Game 3 went to the Senators, but Game 4 in Ottawa was won by the Ducks, for an insurmountable three games to one lead. The Ducks would finish the series in Game 5 at home. The Ducks had been favoured to win the Cup since before the season started. The Senators were the third consecutive Canadian franchise to reach the Final and they suffered the same fate as the Calgary Flames of 2004 and the Edmonton Oilers of 2006.

2007–08: Stanley Cup hangover

The Senators made major changes in their hockey staff during the off-season. On June 17, 2007, General manager John Muckler was fired; he had been in the last year of his contract. Head coach Bryan Murray was subsequently promoted to GM. On July 5, 2007, he hired his nephew Tim Murray as assistant GM, followed by the promotion of assistant coach John Paddock to head coach on July 6, 2007. On August 15, Goaltending coach Ron Low was named as assistant coach while Eli Wilson was named goaltending coach. Assistant coach Greg Carvel retained his duties.

On November 5, 2007, the Senators set a franchise record eighth-straight win with their victory over the Maple Leafs. On November 6, six Senators were named to the All-Star Game ballot: Daniel Alfredsson, Ray Emery, Dany Heatley, Chris Phillips, Wade Redden and Jason Spezza, the most from any one team in the NHL. The "CASH line" was named to the All-Star roster in its entirety, Alfredsson to the starting lineup and Dany Heatley and Jason Spezza as reserves. On January 24, 2008, Alfredsson recorded a franchise-record seven points (three goals and four assists) against the Tampa Bay Lightning, taking over the NHL scoring lead momentarily.

After the hot start, a prolonged slump through January and February occurred during which the Senators won only seven of 21 games, and Murray fired Head Coach Paddock and Assistant Coach Ron Low on February 27, 2008, taking over the coaching duties himself. After the coaching switch, team performance improved but did not match the performance of the beginning of the season. A playoff spot was in doubt until the Senators' last game of the season, a loss to Boston, but the team qualified due to the Carolina Hurricanes losing. After all other games were played, the team ended up as the seventh seed and faced the Pittsburgh Penguins in the opening round, a repeat of the 2007 Eastern Conference Quarterfinals. The Senators lost the series four games to none, the third time they were swept in a first-round series. The result, after going to the Finals the previous season, led to speculation by the media that the team would make a large change in personnel before next season, including the buy-out of Ray Emery and the Senators not re-signing their free agents.

2008–09: Season of turnover

After a disappointing 2007–08 season, Senators' management promised change, and in the off-season fulfilled that promise with changes both in coaching and on-ice personnel. On June 13, 2008, the Senators named Craig Hartsburg, who had been head coach of the OHL's Sault Ste. Marie Greyhounds, as the new head coach, signing him to a three-year contract. The Senators also named Curtis Hunt, formerly of the Regina Pats, as assistant coach. On the player side, the first change was the buy-out of troubled goaltender Ray Emery's contract following a difficult season. Long-time Senator Wade Redden left via free-agency, and 2007–08 trade acquisitions Mike Commodore, Cory Stillman and Martin Lapointe were not re-signed. Brian McGrattan and Andrej Meszaros were traded, Meszaros following a contract dispute. From the free agent market, the Senators signed goaltender Alex Auld, defenceman Jason Smith, and agitating forward Jarkko Ruutu. In exchange for Meszaros, defencemen Filip Kuba, Alexandre Picard and a 2009 first-round draft pick (later dealt for defenceman Chris Campoli) were acquired from the Tampa Bay Lightning.

To start the 2008–09 season, the Senators played their first-ever games in Europe, starting in Gothenburg, Sweden, playing Daniel Alfredsson's former team, Frölunda HC. The Senators then began the regular season with two games in Stockholm against the Pittsburgh Penguins, splitting the results in a 4–3 overtime loss and a 3–1 win. The Senators struggled throughout the first half of the season, having the lowest number of goals scored in the League. Following a disappointing 17–24–7 start, the Senators fired Hartsburg on February 1, 2009, after a 7–4 loss to the Washington Capitals. He was replaced by Cory Clouston, the head coach of their farm team in Binghamton. The team showed almost immediate improvement under Clouston, playing above .500 for the remainder of the season. Though much improved, the team was unable to make up for its poor start, and was officially eliminated from playoff contention on March 31. The team continued to play well, winning nine games in a row at home. On April 8, Clouston was rewarded with a two-year deal to continue coaching the Senators.

2009–10: Return to the playoffs

After the season had concluded, word was leaked that star forward Heatley had demanded a trade, placing GM Murray in a precarious position. On June 30, a deal to Edmonton was finalized, but Heatley rejected it by refusing to waive his no-trade clause. On September 12, 2009, Heatley was traded, along with a fifth-round pick in 2010 NHL Entry Draft, to the San Jose Sharks in exchange for forwards Milan Michalek and Jonathan Cheechoo, as well as a second-round pick in the 2010 NHL Draft. Michalek would play well for the Senators, but Cheechoo struggled and was demoted to the Binghamton Senators before having his contract bought out in the off-season.

On January 13, 2010, Bryan Murray relieved Goaltending Coach Eli Wilson of his duties. Immediately afterward, the team went on a team-record 11-game winning streak. The streak propelled the team to the top of the Northeast Division standings and a top-three placing for the playoffs. The team was unable to hold off the Sabres for the division lead, but qualified for the playoffs in the fifth position. For the third season in four, the Senators played off against the Penguins in the first round. A highlight for the Senators was winning a triple-overtime fifth game in Pittsburgh, but the team was unable to win a playoff game on home ice, losing the series in six games.

2010–11: Rebuilding

The Senators had a much poorer than expected 2010–11 campaign, resulting in constant rumours of a shakeup right through until December.  The rumours were heightened in January after the team went on a lengthy losing streak. January was a dismal month for the Senators, winning only one game all month. Media speculated on the imminent firing of Clouston, Murray or both. Owner Melynk cleared the air in an article in the January 22, 2011 edition of the Ottawa Sun. Melnyk stated that he would not fire either Clouston or Murray, but that he had given up on this season and was in the process of developing a plan for the future. On Monday, January 24, The Globe and Mail reported that the plan included hiring a new general manager before the June entry draft and that Murray would be retained as an advisor to the team. A decision on whether to retain Clouston would be made by the new general manager. The article by Roy MacGregor, a long-time reporter of the Ottawa Senators, stated that former Assistant Coach Pierre McGuire had already been interviewed. Murray, in a press conference that day stated that he wished to stay on as the team's general manager. He also stated that Melnyk was allowing him to continue as general manager without restraint. Murray said that the players were now to be judged by their play until the February 28 trade deadline. Murray would attempt to move "a couple, at least" of the players for draft picks or prospects at that time if the Senators remained out of playoff contention. At the time of Murray's comments the team was eight games under .500 and 14 points out of a playoff position after 49 games.

Murray started with the trading of Mike Fisher to the Nashville Predators in exchange for a first-round pick in the 2011 draft. Fisher already had a home in Nashville with new wife Carrie Underwood. The trading of Fisher, a fan favorite in Ottawa, lead to a small anti-Underwood backlash in the city with the banning of her songs from the play lists of some local radio stations. Murray next traded Chris Kelly, another veteran, to the Boston Bruins for a second-round pick in the 2011 draft. A few days later, pending unrestricted free agent Jarkko Ruutu was sent to the Anaheim Ducks in exchange for a sixth-round pick in 2011. A swap of goaltenders was made with the Colorado Avalanche which brought Craig Anderson to Ottawa in exchange for Brian Elliott. Both goalies were having sub-par seasons prior to the trade. Under-achieving forward Alex Kovalev was traded to the Pittsburgh Penguins for a seventh-round draft pick. On trade deadline day, Ottawa picked up goaltender Curtis McElhinney on waivers, and traded Chris Campoli with a seventh-round pick to the Chicago Blackhawks for a second-round pick and Ryan Potulny. Goaltender Anderson played very well down the stretch for Ottawa, and the team quickly signed the soon-to-be unrestricted free agent to a four-year contract. After media speculation on the future of Murray within the organization, Murray was re-signed as general manager on April 8, to a three-year extension. On April 9, Head Coach Cory Clouston and assistants Greg Carvel and Brad Lauer were dismissed from their positions. Murray said that the decision was made based on the fact that the team entered the season believing it was a contender, but finished with a 32–40–10 record. Former Detroit Red Wings Assistant Coach Paul MacLean was hired as Clouston's replacement on June 14, 2011.

2011–2016: Up and down seasons

As the 2011–12 season began, many hockey writers and commentators were convinced that the Senators would finish at or near the bottom of the NHL standings. In the midst of rebuilding, the Ottawa lineup contained many rookies and inexperienced players. The team struggled out of the gate, losing five of their first six games before a reversal of fortunes saw them win six games in a row. In December 2011, the team acquired forward Kyle Turris from the Phoenix Coyotes in exchange for David Rundblad and a draft pick. The team improved its play afterwards and moved into a playoff position before the All-Star Game. For the first time in Senators' history, the All-Star Game was held in Ottawa, and it was considered a great success. Five Senators were voted in or named to the event, including Daniel Alfredsson, who was named captain of one team. The team continued its playoff push after the break. After starting goalie Craig Anderson injured his hand in a kitchen accident at home, the Senators called up Robin Lehner from Binghamton and acquired highly regarded goaltender Ben Bishop from the St. Louis Blues. While Anderson recovered, the team continued its solid play. On April 1, 2012, the Senators defeated the New York Islanders 5–1, officially ensuring a playoff position. The team finished as the eighth seed in the Eastern Conference, drawing a first round playoff matchup against the Conference champion New York Rangers. Ultimately, Ottawa lost the series in seven games.

The next season, Ottawa would be challenged to repeat the success they had in 2011–12, due to long-term injuries to key players such as Erik Karlsson, Jason Spezza, Milan Michalek and Craig Anderson. Despite these injuries, the Senators would finish seventh in the Eastern Conference and head coach Paul MacLean would go on to win the Jack Adams Award as the NHL's coach of the year. Ottawa would play the second-seeded Montreal Canadiens in the first round of the playoffs, eventually winning in five games, blowing out Montreal 6–1 in games three and five. The Senators would advance to play the top-seeded Pittsburgh Penguins in the second round, this time losing in five games. During the off-season, the Senators traded veteran defenceman Sergei Gonchar to the Dallas Stars in exchange for a sixth-round draft pick in 2013. July 5, 2013 would be a day of mixed emotions for the city and fans, as long-time captain Daniel Alfredsson signed a one-year contract with the Detroit Red Wings, leaving Ottawa after 17 seasons with the Senators and 14 as captain. The signing shocked numerous fans across the city and many within the Senators organization. The day finished optimistically however, as Murray acquired star forward Bobby Ryan from the Anaheim Ducks in exchange for forwards Jakob Silfverberg, Stefan Noesen and a first-round draft pick in 2014. Murray would also sign free agent forward Clarke MacArthur to a two-year contract that same day and would sign free agent defenceman Joe Corvo to a one-year contract three days later on July 8.

For the 2013–14 season, the League re-aligned and Ottawa was moved to the new Atlantic Division along with the rest of the old Northeast Division and the Columbus Blue Jackets and Detroit Red Wings from the Western Conference. The re-alignment increased the competition to qualify for the playoffs, as there was now 16 teams in the East fighting for eight playoff spots. There were changes on the club as well. Ottawa entered the season with Jason Spezza as the team's new captain as long-time captain Daniel Alfredsson left to join the Detroit Red Wings after a contract dispute with the club. The same day that Alfredsson signed, the club swung a deal for Anaheim Ducks' scorer Bobby Ryan. There were numerous other changes to the lineup as well. The club signed free agents Clarke MacArthur and Joe Corvo, while not re-signing veteran defencemen Sergei Gonchar and Andre Benoit. While MacArthur had a career season, Ryan played well until he was injured, and Corvo lost his place in the lineup. The club struggled on defence, with shots and goals against increasing from the previous season. The club was a sub-.500 team much of the season, or only a few games above and never was in a playoff position all season. At the NHL trade deadline, Murray traded for flashy right winger Ales Hemsky from Edmonton and he played well, establishing chemistry on a line alongside Jason Spezza and Milan Michalek, though the club was eliminated from playoff contention in the last week of the season.

In 2014–15, the team made the playoffs, only to lose in the first round.

2017–present: Pierre Dorion era
Murray retired after the 2015–16 season. He had been diagnosed with cancer and the team failed again to make the playoffs. The team promoted assistant GM Pierre Dorion to general manager and hired Guy Boucher and Marc Crawford as associate head coaches. The 2016–17 season was a surprise high point for the team as it made a playoff run to the Eastern Conference Final, losing in double-overtime in the seventh game of the series. The team picked up several veterans that made key contributions and Karlsson, Turris and Ryan made crucial contributions.

The 2017–18 season was a major disappointment. From the playoff run team, the team lost Clarke MacArthur, Marc Methot, Chris Neil, Chris Kelly, Tommy Wingels and Viktor Stalberg. Additionally, captain Erik Karlsson was injured to start the season and first-line center Kyle Turris was in a contract dispute with the team. Turris was traded to the Colorado Avalanche for Matt Duchene. The team at first absorbed the changes and remained in a playoff spot. However, team play declined to the point where the team traded away several veterans at the trade deadline and finished in 30th place in the league. The team hosted an outdoor game to great success, however owner Eugene Melnyk made off-the-cuff comments about fan attendance that soured fan opinions.

Logo and jersey design
The team colours are red, black and white, like the original era Senators, and like other Ottawa sports teams (such as the Ottawa Renegades, Rough Riders and 67s), with added trim of gold. The colours are attributed to the colours of the defunct Ottawa Amateur Athletic Association, the Ottawa Hockey Club being a member club.

The club logo is officially the head of a Roman general, a member of the Senate of the Roman Empire, projecting from a gold circle. There have been several versions of the team logo. The original, unveiled on May 23, 1991, described the general as a "centurion figure, strong and prominent" according to its designer, Tony Milchard. Milchard intended the logo to be similar to that of the Chicago Blackhawks head logo. Leaked before its unveiling, the logo design was unpopular with fans, being compared unfavourably to the American Express card, the USC Trojans and the Trojan condom. The original had the words "Ottawa Senators" within the circle. This logo was slightly revised in 1996 to remove the team name from the gold circle and replace it with laurels.

The original home jersey was white with black and red stripes. The original "away" jersey was black, with white and red trim. Shoulder patches used a winged "S" in "established MDCCCXCIV" (1894) logo. The League changed its policies on coloured and white jerseys and the white jersey became the away jersey. The club would use the white jersey with the original logo until the end of the 2007 Stanley Cup Finals.

In 1998, the Senators unveiled a new logo, taking the head, which had been in profile, and rotating it so that it was face-first. The new logo was unveiled with a new red "third" jersey, prominently using "curved" or "swoosh" stripes. On the shoulder, the original logo was used as a shoulder patch. The original dark jersey, (then the "away" jersey) which was mostly black, was retired after the season. The red jersey became the home jersey and it remained in use until the end of the 2007 Stanley Cup Finals.

Starting in July 2000, the Senators reused the alternate logo on another third jersey, designed by Ottawa firm Hoselton Brunet, this one black with red and gold sleeves and a gold stripe with laurel leaves along the bottom of the jersey. On the shoulders, was a modified version of the original Peace Tower logo of the expansion campaign, which the management liked. Like the original logo, this design was leaked onto the Internet. This jersey was in use until the end of the 2006–07 season.

2007 update

On August 22, 2007, the Senators unveiled a set of new jerseys, which have a more refined, streamlined look to them,. The team retired all three previous jerseys and did not have a third jersey for the 2007–08 season. The updated look came in conjunction with the launch of the new Rbk EDGE jerseys by Reebok, adopted League-wide for the 2007–08 season.

At the same time, the team updated its logos, designed by local firm Acart Communications. The new primary logo is an update of the old secondary logo, which according to team owner Eugene Melnyk, "represents strength and determination." The logo was modified in several ways, updating the facial features, removing facial colouring, reducing size of the gold semicircle and updating the cape of the warrior. The new secondary logo is an update of the old primary logo. Only the primary logo will appear on the jerseys, as the secondary logo will be on Sens' merchandise. The new shoulder patch 'O' logo replaces the winged 'S' shoulder patch with the jersey logo of the original Ottawa Senators club.

2008 and 2011 third jerseys

On November 22, 2008, the Senators unveiled a new third jersey in a game versus the New York Rangers. Marketed with the slogan 'Back in Black' in reference to the black "away" jerseys the team wore during its first several seasons, the jersey is primarily black, while the team's other traditional colors of white and red are also integrated. The Senators' primary "centurion figure" logo moves to the shoulders. The front features the word 'SENS' in white with red and gold trim, as a new primary logo. The 'SENS' third jersey was retired in 2011.

On January 20, 2011, the Ottawa Sun reported that the Senators organization was studying designs for a new third jersey to commemorate the 20th anniversary of the current franchise. The Senators announced to season ticket holders on March 2, 2011, that the new third jersey will be a 'heritage design' based on the early-era Senators jersey. The new third jersey was to be unveiled officially on October 1, 2011, however was mistakenly leaked after being discovered in a souvenir store at First Niagara Center. The jersey will be a 'barber-pole' design with a large 'O' on the front, and shield-shaped badges on each shoulder. One shoulder badge has the words "Ottawa Senators", the other has the words "Sénateurs d'Ottawa".

Mostly black, the third jersey incorporates horizontal striping intended to be reminiscent of the original Senators' 'barber-pole' designs, and the large letter O used in Ottawa jersey designs going back to the 1890s. The new , while an entirely new creation, most resembles the look of the 1926–27 Senators, when the franchise won its last Stanley Cup. Shield-type patches were added to the shoulders. The design of the shield-type patches was intended to be similar to the shield patches that the original Senators added to their jerseys after each Stanley Cup championship win. The patches spell the team name, one in English, and one in French. Jacob Barrette, a local Gatineau, Quebec fan had posted a similar design on the internet since 2009.  The Senators worked with Barrette to develop the jersey design in time for the 20th anniversary season.

2014 Heritage Classic jersey
A special edition jersey was used for the 2014 Heritage Classic against the Vancouver Canucks on March 2, 2014. The jersey shares virtually the same characteristics as their current third jersey, albeit reversed so that cream is the primary colour.

2017 update
The move to Adidas as the NHL's uniform provider necessitated some slight changes in the Senators uniforms. While the overall design was carried over from the Reebok Edge look, the fonts now use the style that was found on the barber-pole third jerseys they wore from 2011–17.

See also
Battle of Ontario
Ice hockey in Ottawa
List of NHL players
List of NHL seasons
List of ice hockey teams in Ontario

References

Bibliography

Notes

External links

 Official website of the Ottawa Senators
 Official website of Bell Sensplex

 
Ottawa Senators
Ottawa Senators (1992-)